The Jammed is a 2007 film written and directed by Dee McLachlan.

The film is a story about human trafficking and the sex slave trade in Melbourne, and the search for three girls trapped by a trafficking syndicate. Court transcripts and actual events were an influence in the production of the film.

The Jammed was nominated for seven AFI Awards, for four FCCA awards and for six IF Awards, winning for best feature film, best script and best music.

The film was favourably reviewed by David Stratton and Margaret Pomeranz. Its original distribution plan of a DVD release was altered soon after filmmaker and distributor John L Simpson of Titan View used his own home mortgage to release the film. It ended up screening on 40 screens in Australia and 10 in New Zealand.

Plot
The film begins with an interrogation in an immigration office of an illegal immigrant working as a prostitute on the verge of being deported. Throughout the film it becomes apparent that one of the interrogators (Damien Richardson) has had sex with the girl at an illegal brothel, negating his encouragement to her to tell the truth.

The film then backtracks to three weeks before when Ashley (Veronica Sywack), a bored, single insurance clerk, unwittingly becomes involved when she meets a Chinese woman, Sunee (Amanda Ma), as a blind-date airport pickup goes wrong.  We learn that Sunee is searching for her daughter, Rubi. Through the various flashbacks, we meet Crystal (Emma Lung), Vanya (Saskia Burmeister) and Rubi (Sun Park), who have all been enslaved in a Melbourne brothel on a premise of "working off their debt" of the cost of being trafficked to Australia using false papers.

Cast

Reception
The film has been generally well received with praise for its frankness and cinematic telling of very serious true stories. Melbourne newspaper The Age said "The story rides on a strong undercurrent of information about the Melbourne sex slave trade, reflecting the extensive research that went into the film."

Box office
The Jammed grossed $861,524 at the box office in Australia.

References

External links 
Official site
 
 Sydney Morning Herald article on the film dated 17 August 2007.
The Jammed: Film Review and Bibliography

2007 films
2007 drama films
Australian drama films
Films shot in Melbourne
Films about prostitution in Australia
Films about human trafficking
Works about sex trafficking
Human trafficking in Australia
2000s English-language films
Films directed by Dee McLachlan